Andrei Conţolenco (born June 22, 1938) is a former Romanian sprint canoer who competed in the 1960s. He won a silver medal in the K-4 1000 m event at the 1963 ICF Canoe Sprint World Championships in Jajce.

Conţolenco also finished seventh in the K-1 1000 m event at the 1968 Summer Olympics in Mexico City.

References

Sports-reference.com profile

1938 births
Canoeists at the 1968 Summer Olympics
Living people
Olympic canoeists of Romania
Romanian male canoeists
ICF Canoe Sprint World Championships medalists in kayak